is a retired Japanese professional shogi player, ranked 7-dan.

Early life
Kobayashi was born on December 18, 1962, in Tamaki, Mie.  He was accepted into the Japan Shogi Association's apprentice school as a student of shogi professional Kazuo Manabe at the rank of 6-kyū in 1978, was promoted to the rank of apprentice professional 1-dan in 1981, and obtained full professional status and the rank of 4-dan in 1983.

Shogi professional
Kobayashi defeated Yasumitsu Satō to win the 11th  in 1992. The victory stopped Satō from winning the tournament three years in a row.

Kobayashi finished the finished 69th Meijin Class C2 league play (April 2010March 2011) with a record of 2 wins and 8 losses, earning a second demotion point which meant he was only one point away from automatic demotion to "Free Class" play. As a result, he declared his intention to the Japan Shogi Association to become a Free Class player as of April 2011 rather than risk automatic demotion.

Kobayashi retired from professional shogi on April 19, 2022.

Personal life
Kobayashi has been an avid mountain climber since his junior high school days.

Promotion history
The promotion history for Kobayashi is as follows:
 1978: 6-kyū
 1981: 1-dan
 1983, August 3: 4-dan
 1989, May 19: 5-dan
 1995, November 29: 6-dan
 2009, November 25: 7-dan
2022, April 19: Retired

Titles and other championships
Kobayashi has never appeared in a major title match, but he has won one non-title shogi championships during his career.

Awards and honors
Kobayashi received the JSA's "25 Years Service Award" in 2009 in recognition of being an active professional for twenty-five years.

References

External links
ShogiHub: Professional Player Info · Kobayashi, Hiroshi (167)

1962 births
Japanese shogi players
Living people
Professional shogi players
Professional shogi players from Mie Prefecture
Retired professional shogi players